Oxycanus niphadias is a moth of the family Hepialidae. It is found in South Australia.

References

Moths described in 1890
Hepialidae
Endemic fauna of Australia